Riparian Preserve at Water Ranch is a lake located in Gilbert, Arizona, United States, east of Greenfield Rd and south of Guadalupe Dr.  The preserve was created by the Town of Gilbert in 1999 to combine water resources, wildlife habitat, educational programs, and recreational opportunities. The Riparian Preserve consists of 110 acres, with 70 acres of 7 water recharge basins.

The Riparian Preserve also includes over 4.5 miles of trails that lead to various vegetative zones, gardens, a paleontology dig site, and an observatory. The Preserve houses approximately 298 species of birds, insects, fish, amphibians, reptiles, and mammals.

Fish species
Rainbow Trout
Largemouth Bass
Sunfish
Catfish (Channel)
Tilapia
Carp

References

External links
Water Ranch Lake
Riparian Preserve

Reservoirs in Arizona
Reservoirs in Maricopa County, Arizona
Geography of Gilbert, Arizona